1951 in sports describes the year's events in world sport.

American football
 NFL Championship: the Los Angeles Rams won 24–17 over the Cleveland Browns at the Los Angeles Memorial Coliseum
 January 14 – The National Football League has its first Pro Bowl Game (Los Angeles).
 September 28 – Norm Van Brocklin sets NFL single game record for most passing yards (554) helping Los Angeles Rams beat New York Yanks 48–21.
 Sugar Bowl (1950 season):
 The Oklahoma Sooners lose 13–7 to the Kentucky Wildcats; still awarded the college football national championship by AP and Coaches Poll

Association football
England
 First Division – Tottenham Hotspur win the 1950–51 title.
 FA Cup – Newcastle United beat Blackpool 2–0.
Spain
 La Liga won by Atlético Madrid
Italy
 Serie A won by Milan.
Germany
 German football championship won by 1. FC Kaiserslautern.
Portugal
 Primeira Liga won by Sporting C.P.
France
 French Division 1 won by Nice.

Athletics
The athletics competition at the 1951 Pan American Games is held in Buenos Aires, Argentina. Mal Whitfield of the USA wins gold medals in three events: 400 m, 800 m and 4 × 400 m relay.

Australian rules football
Victorian Football League
 29 September − Geelong wins the 55th VFL Premiership defeating Essendon 11.15 (81) to 10.10 (70) in the 1951 VFL Grand Final.
 Brownlow Medal is awarded to Bernie Smith (Geelong)
South Australian National Football League
 29 September − Port Adelaide wins its fourteenth SANFL premiership, defeating North Adelaide 10.12 (72) to 9.7 (61) after the Magpies lost only one game for the season.
 Magarey Medal awarded to John Marriott (Norwood)
Western Australian National Football League
 October 13 – West Perth wins its eleventh WANFL premiership, beating South Fremantle 13.10 (88) to 12.13 (85)
 Sandover Medal awarded to Fred Buttsworth (West Perth)

Baseball
 January 29 – baseball signs a six-year All-Star game deal for TV and radio rights for $6 million
 September 30 – Joe DiMaggio plays in his final career regular season game.
 October 3 – In one of the most famous finishes in baseball history, Bobby Thomson of the New York Giants hits a three-run walk-off home run, immortalized as the Shot Heard 'Round the World, to give the Giants a 5–4 win over the Brooklyn Dodgers for the National League title.
 World Series – The New York Yankees win 4 games to 2 over the New York Giants.
 Japan Series – The Yomiuri Giants win 4 games to 2 over the Nankai Hawks.

Basketball
 NCAA Men's Basketball Championship –
 Kentucky wins 68–58 over Kansas.
 NBA Finals –
 Rochester Royals win 4 games to 3 over the New York Knicks
 The seventh European basketball championship, Eurobasket 1951, is won by the Soviet Union.

Boxing
 July 10 – Randy Turpin becomes the middleweight boxing champion by defeating Sugar Ray Robinson.
 July 18 – Jersey Joe Walcott knocks out Ezzard Charles in round 7 during their bout in Pittsburgh, Pennsylvania.

Canadian football
 Grey Cup – Ottawa Rough Riders wins 21–14 over the Saskatchewan Roughriders

Cycling
 Giro d'Italia is won by Fiorenzo Magni of Italy
 Tour de France – Hugo Koblet of Switzerland

Figure skating
 World Figure Skating Championships –
 Men's champion: Dick Button, United States
 Ladies' champion: Jeannette Altwegg, Great Britain
 Pair skating champions: Ria Baran & Paul Falk, Germany

Golf
Men's professional
 Masters Tournament – Ben Hogan
 U.S. Open – Ben Hogan
 PGA Championship – Sam Snead
 British Open – Max Faulkner
 PGA Tour money leader – Lloyd Mangrum – $26,089
 Ryder Cup – United States team wins 9 to 2 over the British team.
Men's amateur
 British Amateur – Dick Chapman
 U.S. Amateur – Billy Maxwell
Women's professional
 Women's Western Open – Patty Berg
 U.S. Women's Open – Betsy Rawls
 Titleholders Championship – Pat O'Sullivan
 LPGA Tour money leader – Babe Zaharias – $15,087

Harness racing
 Tar Heel, a standardbred horse driven by Del Cameron, runs the first two–minute mile in harness racing history.
 Little Brown Jug for pacers is won by Tar Heel
 Hambletonian for trotters is won by Mainliner
 Australian Inter Dominion Harness Racing Championship –
 Pacers: Vedette
 Trotters: Gay Belwin

Horse racing
 July 14 – Citation winds his 32nd race, the Hollywood Gold Cup, becoming the first equine millionaire.
Steeplechases
 Cheltenham Gold Cup – Silver Fame
 Grand National – Nickel Coin
Hurdle races
 Champion Hurdle – Hatton's Grace for the third successive year
Flat races
 Australia – Melbourne Cup is won by Delat
 Canada – King's Plate is won by Major Factor
 France – Prix de l'Arc de Triomphe is won by Tantieme
 Ireland – Irish Derby is won by Fraise du Bois II
 English Triple Crown Races:
 2,000 Guineas Stakes – Ki Ming
 The Derby – Arctic Prince
 St. Leger Stakes – Talma
 United States Triple Crown Races:
 Kentucky Derby – Count Turf
 Preakness Stakes – Bold
 Belmont Stakes – Counterpoint

Ice hockey
 August 26 – Bill Barilko, Toronto Maple Leafs dies in an air crash
 Art Ross Trophy as the NHL's leading scorer during the regular season: Gordie Howe, Detroit Red Wings
 Hart Memorial Trophy – for the NHL's Most Valuable Player: Milt Schmidt, Boston Bruins
 Stanley Cup – Toronto Maple Leafs win 4 games to 1 over the Montreal Canadiens
 World Hockey Championship
 Men's champion: Canada's Lethbridge Maple Leafs
 NCAA Men's Ice Hockey Championship – University of Michigan Wolverines defeat Brown University Bruins 7–1 in Colorado Springs, Colorado

Lacrosse
 The 50th anniversaries of the donations of both the Mann Cup and the Minto Cup.
 The Peterborough Timbermen win the 50th Mann Cup.
 The Mimico Mountaineers win the 50th Minto Cup.

Motorsport

Rugby league
1950–51 European Rugby League Championship / 1951–52 European Rugby League Championship
1951 French rugby league tour of Australia and New Zealand
1951 New Zealand rugby league season
1951 NSWRFL season
1950–51 Northern Rugby Football League season / 1951–52 Northern Rugby Football League season

Rugby union
 57th Five Nations Championship series is won by Ireland

Snooker
 World Snooker Championship – Fred Davis beats Walter Donaldson 58–39.

Speed skating
Speed Skating World Championships
 Men's All-round Champion – Hjalmar Andersen (Norway)

Tennis
Australia
 Australian Men's Singles Championship – Dick Savitt (USA) defeats Ken McGregor (Australia) 6–3, 2–6, 6–3, 6–1
 Australian Women's Singles Championship – Nancye Wynne Bolton (Australia) defeats Thelma Coyne Long (Australia) 6–1, 7–5
England
 Wimbledon Men's Singles Championship – Dick Savitt (USA) defeats Ken McGregor (Australia) 6–4, 6–4, 6–4 
 Wimbledon Women's Singles Championship – Doris Hart (USA) defeats Shirley Fry Irvin (USA) 6–1, 6–0
France
 French Men's Singles Championship – Jaroslav Drobný (Egypt) defeats Eric Sturgess (South Africa) 6–3, 6–3, 6–3
 French Women's Singles Championship – Shirley Fry Irvin (USA) defeats Doris Hart (USA) 6–3, 3–6, 6–3
USA
 American Men's Singles Championship – Frank Sedgman (Australia) defeats Vic Seixas (USA) 6–4, 6–1, 6–1
 American Women's Singles Championship – Maureen Connolly (USA) defeats Shirley Fry Irvin (USA) 6–3, 1–6, 6–4
Davis Cup
 1951 Davis Cup –  3–2  at White City Stadium (grass) Sydney, Australia

Multi-sport events
 First Pan American Games are held in Buenos Aires, Argentina
 Asian Games are held in New Delhi, India
 First Mediterranean Games are held in Alexandria, Egypt

Awards
 Associated Press Male Athlete of the Year – Dick Kazmaier, College football
 Associated Press Female Athlete of the Year – Maureen Connolly, Tennis

References

 
Sports by year